Walter Sisulu University (WSU) is a university of technology and science located in Mthatha, East London (Buffalo City), Butterworth and Komani (Queenstown) in the Eastern Cape, South Africa, which came into existence on 1 July 2005 as a result of a merger between Border Technikon, Eastern Cape Technikon and the University of Transkei. 
The university is named after Walter Sisulu, a prominent figure in the struggle against apartheid.

History

The University of the Transkei was established in the homeland of that name in 1976, initially as a branch of the University of Fort Hare at the request of the homeland government. The Border Technikon and Eastern Cape Technikon were established in the late 1980s and early 1990s.

Vision
As one of six comprehensive universities in South Africa, WSU is a developmental university, focusing on urban renewal and rural development by responding to the socio-economic needs of community, commerce and industry through science, technology and innovation.

Administration and organisation
The university is organised by campus and then by faculty:

Buffalo City (East London)
Faculty of Science, Engineering and Technology
Faculty of Business Sciences
Butterworth
Faculty of Engineering and Technology
Faculty of Business Sciences
Faculty of Education
Komani (Queenstown)
Faculty of Education and School Development
Faculty of Economics and Information Technology SystemsMthathaFaculty of Health Sciences
Faculty of Educational Sciences
Faculty of Humanities, Social Sciences and Law
Faculty of Natural Sciences
Faculty of Commerce and Administration

Academic programs
The university's 175 academic programmes are fully accredited by the Council on Higher Education which monitors higher education quality across South Africa. In addition, many of the programs are also accredited by their respective professional bodies. There are programs offered in the following fields:
Engineering - Mechanical Engineering, Electrical Engineering, Civil Engineering, Built Environment etc.
Science
Health
Information Technology
Business Management
Education
Fashion and Art
Journalism and Broadcasting
Tourism and Hospitality Management

Notable alumni
 Terence Nombembe CA(SA), Auditor-General of South Africa since 2006 to 2013 (B.Com 1982)
 Nonkululeko Gobodo CA(SA), first black woman CA(SA) (B.Com)
 Nomgcobo Jiba, advocate who was the first Deputy National Director of Public Prosecutions
Adv Tembeka Nicholas Ngcukaitobi is a South African lawyer, public speaker, author and political activist. He is a member of the South African Law Reform Commission. Ngcukaitobi has authored the book The Land Is Ours: South Africa's First Black Lawyers and the birth of Constitutionalism.
Judge Mandisa Muriel Lindelwa Maya is the first South African female jurist who has served as President of the Supreme Court of Appeal of South Africa since 26 May 2017.
Judge Mbuyiseli "Russell" Madlanga is a judge of the Constitutional Court of South Africa, having been appointed on 1 August 2013.
Lwazi Lushaba is a revolutionary intellectual. He holds a PhD in Political Science from the University of the Witwatersrand, Johannesburg, South Africa. Prior to obtaining a PhD, he was educated in various institutions including the then University of Transkei, South Africa where he obtained an Honours degree in Politics; Ibadan University, Nigeria where he obtained an M.A. in Philosophy; Centre for Studies in Social Sciences and Culture, Kolkata, India where he successfully completed an MPhil. He has held several teaching positions at universities in Nigeria and South Africa. He currently is a member of the teaching faculty at the University of Cape Town, South Africa where he teaches Politics. His publications include a co-edited book; ‘From National Liberation to Democratic Renaissance’ and a book titled; ‘Development as Modernity, Modernity as Development'''’ both published by CODESRIA. Lwazi Lushaba has been a recipient of several scholarly awards and fellowships.
Doctor Lungile Pepeta was a South African paediatric cardiologist, medical researcher, university professor and activist who also served as the former chairman of the Council of Medical Schemes. 
Dr. Ncumisa Jilata, who became Africa's youngest neurosurgeon at 29 years old.

References

 
Universities in the Eastern Cape
Public universities in South Africa
Educational institutions established in 2005
2005 establishments in South Africa